Goh Young-joon (born 9 July 2001) is a South Korean footballer who plays as a midfielder for Pohang Steelers and the South Korea national team.

Career statistics

Club

References

External links
 

2001 births
Living people
People from Jinju
Sportspeople from South Gyeongsang Province
South Korean footballers
South Korea under-17 international footballers
South Korea under-20 international footballers
South Korea under-23 international footballers
South Korea international footballers
Association football midfielders
K League 1 players
Pohang Steelers players